Fort Defiance was a fort that existed from 1794 to after 1865 on Fort Point in Gloucester, Massachusetts. The location protecting the inner harbor was also called Watch House Point.

History

18th century
Prior to the establishment of Fort Defiance, the British Fort Anne was located on Watch House Point, built in 1703 for Queen Anne's War and rebuilt in 1743 for King George's War, the latter work possibly named Fort Libby. A fortified breastwork was erected on the site during the American Revolutionary War. In 1794 a fort at Gloucester was funded as part of the federal first system of U.S. fortifications. The selectmen of Gloucester requested that Fort Anne be rebuilt as the new fort. The fort was built at the direction of Stephen Rochefontaine, a former French military engineer and Revolutionary War veteran working in the United States as a civilian; the next year he was commissioned a lieutenant colonel and commander of the Corps of Artillerists and Engineers. Assisting him was Major John Lillie, a former artillery officer with the Continental Army and possibly the fort's namesake. The goal was to mount eight seacoast guns with a separate citadel, but as no federal funds were appropriated after 1795, it is not clear how much was accomplished. It was popularly called Fort Lillie until 1814 but never assigned an official name except Fort at Gloucester by the US Army.

19th century
The fort was probably upgraded in 1807 under the second system of U.S. fortifications, as it appears in the secretary of war's fortifications report dated December 1808. It is briefly mentioned as "the old fort of stone, in front of this place... has been repaired". The report for December 1811 states "At the head of the harbor, an enclosed battery, mounting seven guns, covered by a blockhouse". In 1814, during the War of 1812, the fort was renamed Fort Defiance. The fort went into caretaker status after that war, but the caretaker was later removed. The fort was burned by vandals in 1833, and rebuilt in 1851. Watch House Point, an 1860 painting of the fort by Fitz Henry Lane, shows the fort with stone-faced walls topped by earth. It was garrisoned during the Civil War and possibly rearmed. Abandoned after that war, the land remained a federal reservation into the 1920s; it is unclear when the fort was demolished. Currently, nothing remains of the fort.

See also
 Stage Fort
 Eastern Point Fort
 Seacoast defense in the United States
 List of coastal fortifications of the United States
List of military installations in Massachusetts

References

Bibliography 

 

 
 

Defiance
Buildings and structures in Gloucester, Massachusetts
Defiance
Defiance
Defiance
Defiance
Military installations closed in the 1860s
Demolished buildings and structures in Massachusetts
1794 establishments in Massachusetts
1860s disestablishments in Massachusetts